"Under mitt tunna skinn" is a song written by Patrik Isaksson, and performed by himself at Melodifestivalen 2008, where it participated in the second semi-final inside the Cloetta Center in Linköping. The song was released as a single on 28 February 2008 and it entered  Svensktoppen on 16 March 2008.

Contributors
Patrik Isaksson – song, composer, lyrics
Johan Röhr – piano
Joacim Backman – guitar
Jimmy Källqvist – bass

Charts

References 

2008 singles
Melodifestivalen songs of 2008
Patrik Isaksson (singer) songs
Swedish-language songs
2008 songs